Taking Off is a studio album by David Sanborn, released in 1975 on Warner Bros. Records. The album reached number 19 on Billboards Jazz Albums chart.

Track listing
All tracks composed by David Matthews except where noted.

 "Butterfat" (Steve Khan) – 3:02
 "'Way 'Cross Georgia" (Coleridge-Taylor Perkinson) – 4:27
 "Duck Ankles" (Steve Khan) – 3:20
 "Funky Banana" – 3:16
 "The Whisperer" (Don Grolnick) – 4:47
 "It Took a Long Time" (Randy Brecker) – 3:29
 "Black Light" – 6:30
 "Blue Night" – 3:45
 "Flight" – 4:07

 Personnel Musicians David Sanborn – alto saxophone 
 Don Grolnick – acoustic piano, clavinet, Fender Rhodes, synthesizers, arrangements (5)
 Steve Khan – electric guitar, acoustic guitar, 12-string electric guitar
 Joe Beck – electric guitar (4)
 Buzz Feiten – electric guitar (4)
 Will Lee – bass guitar 
 Chris Parker – drums (1-6)
 Rick Marotta – additional drums (1, 3)
 Steve Gadd – drums (7, 8, 9)
 Ralph MacDonald – bongos, percussion, congas (7, 8, 9)
 José Madera – percussion (7, 8, 9)
 Warren Smith – percussion (7, 8, 9)
 Howard Johnson – baritone saxophone, tuba, arrangements (2)
 Michael Brecker – tenor saxophone
 Tom Malone – trombone
 Randy Brecker – trumpet, arrangements (6)
 John Clark – French horn (2)
 Peter Gordon – French horn (2)
 David Matthews – arrangements (1, 3, 4, 5, 7, 8, 9)
Strings (7, 8, 9)
 Charles McCracken – cello
 George Ricci – cello
 Lucien Schmit – cello
 John Beal – double bass
 Bob Daugherty – double bass
 Al Brown – viola
 Harold Coletta – viola
 Manny Vardi – viola
 Emile Charlap – violin, string contractor 
 Harry Clickman  – violin
 Lou Eley – violin
 Paul Gershman – violin
 Harry Glickman – violin
 Leo Kahn – violin
 Harold Kohon – violin
 Charles Libove – violin
 Guy Lumia – violin
 David Nadien – violin, concertmaster 
 Gene Orloff – violin
 Max Pollikoff – violin
 Matthew Raimondi – violinProduction'
 John Court – producer
 Don Hahn – engineer, remixing (1-4, 6-9)
 Lee Herschberg – remixing (5)
 Sam Ginsberg – assistant engineer
 Ed Thrasher – art direction
 Robert Lockhart – design 
 Benno Friedman – photography

References

1975 debut albums
David Sanborn albums
Albums arranged by David Matthews (keyboardist)
Warner Records albums